Michael Kramer (February 21, 1886 – September 29, 1955) was an American farmer. railway employee, and politician.

Kramer was born on a farm in Adams, Mower County, Minnesota and went to the Mower County public schools. He lived in Belview, Redwood County, Minnesota with his wife and family and was a farmer and a railway mail clerk. Krmaer served in the Minnesota House of Representatives from 1923 to 1932. He died in Redwood County, Minnesota.

References

1886 births
1955 deaths
People from Mower County, Minnesota
People from Redwood County, Minnesota
Farmers from Minnesota
Members of the Minnesota House of Representatives